The 30th Arizona State Legislature, consisting of the Arizona State Senate and the Arizona House of Representatives, was constituted in Phoenix from January 1, 1971, to December 31, 1972, during the first two years of Jack Williams' third term as Governor of Arizona. Due to a state constitutional amendment, the election of 1970 was the first in Arizona with a four-year term for the governor.  The legislature remained at two-year terms. While the number of senators remained constant at 30 and the members of the house of representatives held steady at 60, the structure of the legislature changed. In the prior legislature, it had been broken into 8 districts, with two of those districts (districts 7 and 8) further broken down into sub-districts (6 and 15 sub-districts, respectively). Beginning with this legislature, the structure was changed to 30 districts, with a single senator and two representatives from each district. The Republicans picked up a single seat in the Senate, giving them an 18–12 edge in the upper house, while the balance in the lower house remained with a Republican edge of 34–26.

Sessions
The Legislature met for two regular sessions at the State Capitol in Phoenix. The first opened on January 11, 1971, and adjourned on May 14; while the second convened on January 10, 1972, and adjourned on May 14. There was a single Special Session, which convened on September 27, 1971, and adjourned on October 21.

State Senate

Members

The asterisk (*) denotes members of the previous Legislature who continued in office as members of this Legislature.

House of Representatives

Members 
The asterisk (*) denotes members of the previous Legislature who continued in office as members of this Legislature.

References

Arizona legislative sessions
1971 in Arizona
1972 in Arizona
1971 U.S. legislative sessions
1972 U.S. legislative sessions